Antonio Giarola born in 1957, is an Italian poet, circus and theater director and circus historian.

Biography
Graduated in Dramaturgy at the University of Literature and Philosophy in Bologna, Italy, he began his career at the Teatro Laboratorio in Verona in the early 1980s as an assistant to Ezio Maria Caserta. In 1984 he created his own circus, the Clown's Circus. which constitutes the first example of Theatrical Direction applied to the Classical Circus in the history of the Italian Circus
He was one of the founders of the Accademia d'Arte Circense in Verona (1988), where he taught Circus History (1988-1989). He directed the City of Verona International Circus Festival (1992-1994). From 2009 to 2011 he was artistic director of the Salieri Opera Festival in Legnago. He is currently President of the National Association for the Development of Circus Arts (ANSAC) and of the Circus Arts Documentation Educational Center (CEDAC) in Verona. As a Circus Historian, he is the author of various publications and represents the World Circus Federation with conferences in Europe, China and Canada, he also participated as a speaker at the La Biennale di Venezia convention with David Larible. As a Poet, Historian and Journalist, he has made several publications. He was a member of the Circuses and Traveling Shows Commission at the Italian Ministry of Cultural Activities (1996-2002). He also is the artistic director of The International Salieri Circus Festival, which intends to be the unique competitive festival on the national and international scene presenting a competition of circus numbers with classical music as soundtrack.

Circus direction
 Il Circo, Una Festa, Clown's Circus, Italy, 1984
 Il Circo in Arena, Il Florilegio di Darix Togni, Verona, Italy, 1991-1998 
 Omaggio a Federico, Antico Circo Orfei, Rome, Italie, directed with Ambra Orfei, 1994
 Bellissimo, Hermann Renz, Netherlands 2007
 Carnevale, Circus Nikulin, Moscow, Russia, 2015
 Veneziano, Circus Nikulin, Izhevsk, Russia, 2016
 Hi-Ten Show, Hi-Ten Circus, Sanya, China, directed with Joseph Bouglione, 2016
 Hi-Ten Show, Hi-Ten Circus, Lijiang, China, 2016
 Venice Tribute, Hi-Ten Circus, Beijing, China, 2018
 Fantastika, Cirque Nikulin, Moscow, Russia, 2020

Theatrical direction
Ringraziamento all'Arte ch'io professo, Lyrics and Music by Antonio Salieri, Salieri Opera Festival, Legnago, Verona, 2009-2011 
Varietas Delectat, RBR Dance Company, tournées in Italy and in Saint Petersburg, Russia, 2009-2012
Il Circo di Zeus - RBR Dance Company, tournées in Italy, 2015
White. Un Viaggio nel Colore dei Nostri Sogni, Equestrian Theater, 2014-2016
Horse Dreaming, Equestrian Theater, Qingdao, China, directed with Mario Luraschi, 2019

Equestrian theater direction
 Zlatne Grive, Arena, Pula, Croatia, 1988–1989
 La Briglia D'Oro, Fieracavalli, Verona, 1991
 Rêve, an Equestrian Dream, Bobbejaanland, Belgium, 2009
 Horse Music, Nuit du Cheval, Paris, 2013
 Visions, Fieracavalli, Verona, 2014
 Horse Dance, Nuit du Cheval, Paris
 Anniversary, Fieracavalli, Verona, 2018
 Rêve, Salon du Cheval d'El Jadida, El Jadida, 2019
 Dreams, Fieracavalli, Verona, 2019
 Chakras, Teatro Tenda Villa Giona, Italia, 2022

Publications

Essays
Circo Classico e Nuovo Circo in Italia e all'estero, publisher La Biennale di Venezia - Musicateatrodanza n.4, 2000
Il Circo Contemporaneo: Alla Ricerca di Una Nuova Identità, en Aa.Vv., Il Circo e La Scena. Forme Dello Spettacolo Contemporaneo, Edizioni La Biennale di Venezia 2001
CEDAC – Documenti e Attività 2003-2006, publisher ANSAC-CEDAC, 2006
CEDAC – Documenti e Attività 2007-2008, publisher ANSAC-CEDAC, 2008
CEDAC – Documenti e Attività 2009-2010, publisher Equilibrando, 2010 
CEDAC – Documenti e Attività 2011-2012, publisher Equilibrando, 2012 
Corpo Animali Meraviglie. Le Arti Circensi a Verona tra Sette e Novecento, publisher Equilibrando, 2013 
CEDAC – Documenti e Attività 2013-2014, publisher Equilibrando, 2014 
CEDAC – Documenti e Attività 2015-2016, publisher Equilibrando, 2016 
CEDAC – Documenti e Attività 2017-2020, publisher Equilibrando, 2020 
 Il pericolo è il mio mestiere! in Il circo e la scena : forme dello spettacolo contemporaneo, publisher La Biennale di Venezia, 2001

Poems
Simbiosi, Edizioni MG, 1978
Poesie (1972-1989), Edizioni MG, 1989
Carnaval, (photo by Marco Bertin), Giunti Editore, Florence, 1995
Fiabe, Edizioni del Leone, 1998
Masquerade (photo by Marco Bertin) publisher Edel Classics, Hambourg, 2005 
Il Circo Classico, publisher Equilibrando, 2007, 
White. Un Viaggio nel Colore dei Nostri Sogni, publisher Equilibrando, 2014 
Il Circo, Una Festa: poesie, publisher Equilibrando, 2019

Translations
Antinoo, Epigrammi d’Amore, (translation from Greek to Italian), publisher Equilibrando, 2012 
Gustavo Bernstein, Esercizi di Fede, (translation from Spanish to Italian), publisher Equilibrando, 2018

Bibliography

References

External links
 Official site
 Italian Show dictionary Mame 

1957 births
Living people